Rhinorex is a genus of kritosaurin hadrosaur from the Late Cretaceous Neslen Formation, in central Utah. Its exact placement in time is uncertain, though it probably dates to 75 million years ago and was discovered in estuarine sediments.

It is likely a close relative of Gryposaurus, and indeed some have suggested that it falls within the genus Gryposaurus, as the phylogenetic analysis indicates.

It is found in a very similar time and place as Gryposaurus monumentensis and Gryposaurus sp. This would challenge the idea of provincialism in Late Cretaceous Laramidian faunas. It may be that Rhinorex lived in more coastal environments than Gryposaurus. The holotype specimen BYU 13258 is composed of a partial but mostly articulated skeleton, which includes the skull, the vertebral column and a partial pelvis.

Etymology
The type and only valid species known is Rhinorex condrupus. The genus name is derived from the Greek word "rhinos" which means "nose", and the Latin word "rex" which means "king." The specific name is derived from the Latin word "condo" which means "bury" and refers to the specimen being buried in rock and the Latin word "rupes" which means "cliffs" and is a reference to the fossil being discovered in the Book Cliffs of Utah.

See also
 Timeline of hadrosaur research

References

Saurolophines
Late Cretaceous dinosaurs of North America
Fossil taxa described in 2014
Paleontology in Utah
Campanian genus first appearances
Campanian genus extinctions
Ornithischian genera